Daisy Cooper (born 29 October 1981) is a British Liberal Democrat politician who has served as the Member of Parliament (MP) for St Albans since 2019. She has served as the Deputy Leader of the Liberal Democrats since 2020, and as the Liberal Democrat spokesperson for Health, Wellbeing and Social Care since 2021. 

Cooper was previously the Liberal Democrat spokesperson for Education from September 2020 to October 2021, and the spokesperson for Justice and Digital, Culture, Media and Sport from January 2020 to September 2020.

Early life and career 
Cooper was born in 1981 in Bury St Edmunds, Suffolk. She gained a Bachelor of Laws honours degree from Leeds University and a Master of Laws degree in public international law from Nottingham University, as well as a foundation certificate in psychotherapy and counselling. Before becoming an MP, Cooper worked in Commonwealth affairs, for Voluntary Service Overseas, for the Hacked Off campaign for victims of press abuse, and for the cross-party group More United. She took part in the "Save the St Albans Pubs" campaign. She also runs a local independent campaign group for rail users.

Political career 
Cooper was the Liberal Democrat candidate for Suffolk Coastal constituency in the 2010 general election, where she came second behind future cabinet minister Thérèse Coffey. She stood for president of the Liberal Democrats in 2014, coming second to Sal Brinton. During the campaign for the presidency, she declared her support for the group "Humanist and Secularist Liberal Democrats". In the 2015 general election, Cooper stood in Mid Sussex where she came fourth, losing to the Conservative incumbent Nicholas Soames. Cooper also stood in the 2015 Lewes District Council election held on the same day; she was elected to represent the Lewes Bridge ward. Cooper stepped down as a councillor in 2016. She was the Liberal Democrat candidate for St Albans in the 2017 general election, in which she came second. In 2019, she ran Jo Swinson's successful leadership campaign.

Cooper was elected as the first Liberal Democrat MP for St Albans in the 2019 general election, winning it from the incumbent Conservative MP, Anne Main, who had held the seat since 2005. She is the first liberal MP to be elected to represent this constituency since a Liberal was returned in 1904. The Guardian named Cooper as one of the ten new MPs from all political parties to "watch out for". In January 2020, it was announced Cooper had been appointed as the party's justice, culture, media and sport spokesperson. In June, she took part in George Floyd protests in Verulamium Park, St Albans, where she gave a speech about police brutality. In September 2020, Cooper was announced as the party's new deputy leader and education spokesperson.

In May 2021, Cooper was a signatory to an open letter from Stylist magazine, alongside celebrities and other public figures, which called on the government to address what it described as an "epidemic of male violence" by funding an "ongoing, high-profile, expert-informed awareness campaign on men’s violence against women and girls".

References

External links 

 

1981 births
21st-century English women politicians
Alumni of the University of Leeds
Alumni of the University of Nottingham
Councillors in East Sussex
Female members of the Parliament of the United Kingdom for English constituencies
English LGBT rights activists
Liberal Democrats (UK) MPs for English constituencies
Liberal Democrats (UK) councillors
Living people
People from St Albans
UK MPs 2019–present
Women councillors in England